The men's sprint competition at the 2002 Asian Games was held from 4 to 8 October at the Geumjeong Velodrome.

Schedule
All times are Korea Standard Time (UTC+09:00)

Records

Results
Legend
DNS — Did not start

200 metres flying start

1/8 finals

Heat 1

Heat 2

Heat 3

Heat 4

Heat 5

Heat 6

Repechages

Heat 1

Heat 2

Final (9~12)

1/4 finals

Heat 1

Heat 2

Heat 3

Heat 4

Final (5~8)

Semifinals

Heat 1

Heat 2

Finals

Final (3~4)

Final (1~2)

Final standing

References

External links 
Qualification Results
Final Results

Track Men sprint